Crassispira latizonata is a species of sea snail, a marine gastropod mollusk in the family Pseudomelatomidae.

Description
The length of the shell attains 9 mm, its diameter 3.5 mm.

The solid, acuminate, ovate shell contains 8 whorls. The general aspect of the surface of this shell is granulous, but on closer examination the upper third part of each whorl is found to exhibit only the longitudinal ribs, which are suddenly directed obliquely to the left. The white band occupies about half the whorl, and includes the four upper series of granules. The transverse striation is fine and most easily seen on the upper part of the whorls.

Distribution
This species occurs in the Caribbean Sea and the Lesser Antilles; also off Brazil.

References

 Fallon P.J. (2011) Descriptions and illustrations of some new and poorly known turrids (Turridae) of the tropical northwestern Atlantic. Part 2. Genus Crassispira Swainson, 1840, subgenera Monilispira Bartsch & Rehder, 1939 and Dallspira Bartsch, 1950. The Nautilus 125(1): 15–28.

External links
 
 

latizonata
Gastropods described in 1882